The 1946 Aberdare by-election was a parliamentary by-election held on 5 December 1946 for the British House of Commons constituency of Aberdare in Wales.  The seat had become vacant when the Labour Member of Parliament (MP) George Hall had been created Viscount Hall on 28 October 1946. Hall had held the seat since the 1922 general election. The Labour candidate, David Thomas, held the seat for the party. He remained the constituency's MP until his death in 1954, when a further by-election was held.

The 1946 by-election was the best performance at the time by Plaid Cymru in the industrial valleys of South Wales.

Result

References

Further reading

Aberdare by-election
By-elections to the Parliament of the United Kingdom in Welsh constituencies
Aberdare by-election
Aberdare by-election, 1946
History of Rhondda Cynon Taf
Aberdare by-election
Aberdare by-election, 1946